Leonardo ("Leo") Adrián Rodríguez Iacobitti (born 27 August 1966) is an Argentine former football midfielder. He played for nine different club sides in his career, and represented the Argentina national football team between 1991 and 1994.

Club career
Rodríguez was born in the city of Lanús in the Buenos Aires Province of Argentina. He started his career at Club Atlético Lanús in the Argentine 2nd Division in 1983 and finished his career in 2002 at the same club.

In between this, he had two spells with San Lorenzo and Universidad de Chile as well as playing for Vélez Sársfield and Argentinos Juniors in Argentina, Toulon in France, Atalanta B.C. in Italy and Club América in Mexico and he also had a spell with Borussia Dortmund in Germany.

International career
Rodríguez played for Argentina between 1991 and 1994. He helped La Selección to win the Copa América in 1991 and 1993 and he was part of the 1994 FIFA World Cup squad. He also helped Argentina win the 1992 Confederations Cup, in which he scored in the final itself.

International goals 
''Argentina score listed first, score column indicates score after each Rodríguez goal.

Personal life
His son, Thomas, is a professional footballer.

Honours

Club
Universidad de Chile
 Primera División de Chile (3): 1995, 1999, 2000
 Copa Chile (2): 1998, 2000

San Lorenzo
 Copa Mercosur (1): 2001
 Copa Sudamericana (1): 2002

International
Argentina
 Copa América: 1991, 1993
 FIFA Confederations Cup: 1992
 Artemio Franchi Trophy: 1993

References

External links
 

1966 births
Living people
Sportspeople from Lanús
Argentine footballers
Argentina international footballers
1991 Copa América players
1992 King Fahd Cup players
1993 Copa América players
1994 FIFA World Cup players
Copa América-winning players
FIFA Confederations Cup-winning players
Association football midfielders
Club Atlético Lanús footballers
Club Atlético Vélez Sarsfield footballers
Argentinos Juniors footballers
San Lorenzo de Almagro footballers
Ligue 1 players
SC Toulon players
Atalanta B.C. players
Borussia Dortmund players
Club América footballers
Universidad de Chile footballers
Argentine Primera División players
Serie A players
Serie B players
Bundesliga players
Chilean Primera División players
Argentine expatriate footballers
Expatriate footballers in France
Expatriate footballers in Italy
Expatriate footballers in Germany
Expatriate footballers in Mexico
Expatriate footballers in Chile
Argentine expatriate sportspeople in France
Argentine expatriate sportspeople in Germany
Argentine expatriate sportspeople in Italy
Argentine expatriate sportspeople in Mexico